Boone County Airport  is a public airport in Boone County, Arkansas. Also known as Boone County Regional Airport, it is four miles northwest of Harrison, Arkansas and serves the surrounding areas including Branson, Missouri. It is used for general aviation and sees one airline, a service subsidized by the federal government's Essential Air Service program at a cost of $2,251,207 per year.

The National Plan of Integrated Airport Systems for 2021–2025 categorized it as a national/regional airport (the commercial service category requires at least 2,500 enplanements per year).

Central Airlines served Harrison starting in 1957; successor Frontier Airlines continued into the 1970s.

Facilities

The airport covers 425 acres (172 ha) at an elevation of 1,365 feet (416 m) above mean sea level . Its single runway, 18/36, is 6,161 by 150 feet (1,878 x 46 m) asphalt.

In the year ending December 31, 2021 the airport had 10,750 aircraft operations, an average of 29 per day: 68% general aviation, 20% airline, 11% air taxi and 1% military. In April 2022, there were 48 aircraft based at this airport: 37 single-engine, 8 multi-engine, 2 jet and 1 helicopter.

Airlines and destinations

Statistics

See also 
 M. Graham Clark Downtown Airport
 Branson Airport
 Northwest Arkansas Regional Airport

References

Other sources 

 Essential Air Service documents (Docket OST-1997-2935) from the U.S. Department of Transportation:
 Order 2005-1-14: selecting Air Midwest, Inc., to provide essential air service at El Dorado/Camden, Jonesboro, Harrison and Hot Springs, Arkansas, at a subsidy rate of $4,155,550 annually for a two-year rate term.
 Order 2007-1-7: selecting Air Midwest, Inc. to provide essential air service at El Dorado/Camden, Jonesboro, Harrison and Hot Springs, Arkansas, at a subsidy rate of $4,296,348 annually for the two-year rate term beginning April 1, 2007.
 Order 2009-6-25: tentatively selecting Alaska Juneau Aeronautics, Inc. d/b/a SeaPort Airlines (SeaPort) to provide subsidized essential air service (EAS) at El Dorado/Camden, Harrison, Hot Springs, and Jonesboro, Arkansas, for two years.
 Order 2009-7-8: making final the tentative selection of Alaska Juneau Aeronautics, Inc. d/b/a SeaPort Airlines, to provide essential air service at El Dorado/Camden, Harrison, Hot Springs, and Jonesboro, Arkansas.

External links 
 Boone County Regional Airport, official website
 Boone County Airport (HRO) at the Arkansas Department of Aeronautics
 Aerial image as of 28 February 2001 from USGS The National Map
 

Airports in Arkansas
Essential Air Service
Transportation in Boone County, Arkansas
Buildings and structures in Boone County, Arkansas